Renz Marion Aluquin Fernandez (born September 8, 1985) is a Filipino actor. He is the son of Rudy Fernandez and  Lorna Tolentino and grandson of film director Gregorio Fernandez. He is a contract star of ABS-CBN's Star Magic, but in 2013 he starred in the GMA television series Prinsesa ng Buhay Ko as  Luis Grande. He worked with his half-brother Mark Anthony Fernandez (whom he played younger version of character) for their father's film Matimbang pa sa dugo  (1995) and Magpakailanman episode Lubog sa putik is based on 2009 Quezon floods.

Filmography

Television

Films

References

External links
 

Star Magic
ABS-CBN personalities
Filipino male child actors
Filipino male television actors
Living people
Renz
1985 births
GMA Network personalities
Filipino people of Kapampangan descent
Tagalog people
20th-century Filipino male actors
21st-century Filipino male actors
Filipino male film actors